Agafonik is an old and uncommon Russian Christian male first name. Its feminine version is Agafonika. The name is derived from the Greek name Agathonikos, which in turn derives from words agathos—meaning kind—and nikē—meaning victory.

The diminutives of "Agafonik" are Agafonya and Agafosha, as well as Gafon, Gapon, Gafa, Gapa, Nika, and Aga.

The patronymics derived from "Agafonik" are "" (Agafonikovich; masculine) and "" (Agafonikovna; feminine).

References

Notes

Sources
А. В. Суперанская (A. V. Superanskaya). "Словарь русских имён" (Dictionary of Russian Names). Издательство Эксмо. Москва, 2005. 
Н. А. Петровский (N. A. Petrovsky). "Словарь русских личных имён" (Dictionary of Russian First Names). ООО Издательство "АСТ". Москва, 2005. 

